Mir Munawar Ali Talpur (born 21 March 1956) is a veteran Pakistani politician hailing from Mirpurkhas, Sindh, who has been a member of the National Assembly of Pakistan, since August 2018. Previously he was a member of the National Assembly from 2008 to May 2018 and the Provincial Assembly of Sindh from February 1985 to October 1999.

Political career

He was elected to the National Assembly of Pakistan as a candidate of Pakistan Peoples Party (PPP) since 2008, from Constituency NA-227 (Mirpurkhas-cum-Umerkot-II) in 2008 Pakistani general election.

He was re-elected to the National Assembly as a candidate of PPP from Constituency NA-227 (Mirpurkhas-cum-Umerkot-II) in 2013 Pakistani general election.

He was re-elected to the National Assembly as a candidate of PPP from Constituency NA-219 (Mirpur Khas-II) in 2018 Pakistani general election.

He was elected to the Sindh Assembly several times from 1985 onward, from PS-59 in 1985; from PS-52 in 1988; PS-52 in 1990; PS-52 from 1993; and PS-52 from 1997.

References

Living people
1956 births
Pakistan People's Party MNAs
Pakistani MNAs 2008–2013
Pakistani MNAs 2013–2018
Pakistani MNAs 2018–2023
Zardari family